The Ukrainian National Assembly – Ukrainian People's Self-Defence (УНА-УНСО, UNA-UNSO) is a Ukrainian nationalist organisation.  It was composed by a political wing (the Ukrainian National Assembly - UNA) and a paramilitary wing (Ukrainian People's Self-Defence - UNSO).

According to Andreas Umland and Anton Shekhovtsov, the UNA-UNSO was created in 1991 as a "formation manned by UNA members who had served in the Soviet armed forces ... to confront the State Committee on the State of Emergency". The UNA-UNSO has been described by International-security expert Andrew McGregor as a "influential but fringe movement", which deeply influenced far-right politics in Ukraine due its visibility and militancy, although it still had small numbers. Although the Ukrainian National Assembly (UNA) was the organisation's political wing, on 22 May 2014 it merged with Right Sector; the UNSO continues to operate independently.

The UNSO has participated in multiple international conflicts by sending volunteers to support various belligerents. Including the First Nagorno-Karabakh War, Transnistria War, the War in Abkhazia, First Chechen War, the Yugoslav Wars and the Russo-Ukrainian War.

History

Early years
The UNA was created on 30 June 1990 in Lviv as the Ukrainian Interparty Assembly (UMA), led by maverick politician and nationalist writer Dmytro Korchynsky. On 3–4 November 1990, a congress of the Ukrainian National Association (UNS) was held in Kyiv. On 11 January 1991, UNS squads headed by Yuriy Tyma guarded the Seimas Palace during the January Events in Lithuania. On 30 June 1991, about 200 UNS members held a torchlight parade in Lviv commemorating the 1941 declaration of Ukrainian independence.

During the first days of the 1991 Soviet coup d'état attempt, a UNS squad led by Vietnam War veteran Valeriy Bobrovych left for Moscow; the squad later laid the foundations for the Argo battalion. On 19 August 1991, during the struggle against the State Committee on the State of Emergency, the UNS created squads of the Ukrainian People's Self-Defense (UNSO) in Kyiv. The squads were formed around a small group of ethnic-Ukrainian Soviet army veterans of the war in Afghanistan. In December 1990 Yuriy Shukhevych, the son of Roman Shukhevych, was elected as the first leader of the UNS. Because of the 8 September 1991 Declaration of Independence of Ukraine, the sixth session of the UMA was renamed the Ukrainian National Assembly; it became known as the UNA-UNSO, due to the UNSO's close association with the UNA.

Since its 1991 independence, Ukraine has had separatist movements aiming to reunite portions of Ukraine with Russia and other neighbouring countries. UNA-UNSO stopped People's Deputy  Goncharov of the Supreme Soviet of the Soviet Union from reestablishing the Donetsk–Krivoy Rog Soviet Republic and the Donetsk National Guard in the Donbas. In Kyiv, the Patriotic Forum (Otyechestvyennyi forum) was abolished. In November 1991 the UNSO held a rally, and due to a brawl involving UNSO fighters the government made the first mass arrests of UNSO activists. In Odessa UNSO halted an initiative to create a Novorossiysk Republic, influencing separatist movements in Bukovina and Zakarpattia. On 7 June 1992, an UNSO group from Lviv broke up a Romanian congress in Chernivtsi which advocated the unification of northern Bukovina and Romania. In early 1993, the UNSO had a reported 4,000 members.

Since 1994 

The UNA was registered as a political party in December 1994, and in the 1994 Ukrainian parliamentary election three UNA-UNSO members were elected as deputies to the Verkhovna Rada (Ukrainian parliament). In September 1995, its registration was suspended until 1997.

UNSO was registered as a public organization in Lviv, Ternopil, Rivne and Poltava Oblasts only. In practise, however, there was no distinction between the membership of both organizations.

From 1994 to 1997, UNA-UNSO members became prominent in Ukraine through a number of anti-Russian activities. UNA-UNSO deputies destroyed a Russian flag in the Verkhovna Rada, UNA-UNSO fighters joined Chechen rebels in the First Chechen War and activists organised demonstrations against Russian pop singers visiting Ukraine. UNA-UNSO took sides in Ukrainian church affairs and clashed with police during the July 1995 funeral of Patriarch Volodomyr, head of the Ukrainian Orthodox Church of the Kyivan Patriarchate. The organisations supported Patriarch Filaret Denysenko, who was excommunicated by the Russian Orthodox Church, and participated in violent attempts to seize property for the new church (particularly in Rivne and Volyn Oblasts). Membership peaked at around 10,000 members, about 90 percent of whom were between 18 and 35 years old. The organisation was depicted in Georgiy Gongadze's 1994 documentary film, Shadows of War.

In 1997, the government of Leonid Kuchma banned the Ukrainian National Assembly – Ukrainian National Self Defence. UNA-UNSO members responded with violent street protests, resulting in over 250 arrests. Dmytro Korchynsky, one of those arrested, soon left the organisation.

In 1998, UNA-UNSO's new leaders were Andriy Shkil and Yuriy Shukhevych, the son of Ukrainian nationalist Roman Shukhevych. In the 1998 Ukrainian parliamentary election, the organisation received 0.39 percent of the vote.

Ukrainian National Assembly – Ukrainian Nationalistic Self Defense members participated in the 2000–01 Ukraine without Kuchma protest campaign. In the 2002 parliamentary elections Andriy Shkil won an electoral district in Lviv Oblast and a seat in the Verkhovna Rada, the party itself won 0.04% of the votes. In 2003 Shkil left the party, and he has become an aide to Yulia Tymoshenko. During the Orange Revolution UNA-UNSO members supported Viktor Yushchenko against his pro-Russian opponents, providing security for Yushchenko supporters and Orange leaders such as Yulia Tymoshenko in Kyiv's Independence Square.

In 2005, Yuriy Shukhevych again became the party's leader. In the 2006 parliamentary election, it failed to win parliamentary representation with 0.06 percent of the vote and did not participate in the 2007 election.

In 2008, South Ossetian attorney general Teimuraz Khugayev accused UNA-UNSO of joining a Georgian unit during the August war, but no evidence has been provided. According to an August 2009 Russian Investigative Committee report, 200 UNA-UNSO members and soldiers from the Ukrainian Ground Forces aided Georgia during the fighting. Ukraine denied the accusation. UNA-UNSO deputy head Mykola Karpyuk said that "unfortunately", no organisation members took part in the Georgian conflict.

UNA-UNSO participated in the 2012 Ukrainian parliamentary election, receiving 0.08 percent of the national vote and winning none of the five electoral districts in which they fielded candidates.) and thus failed to win parliamentary representation.

In March 2014, Russia brought a criminal case against the party and some of its members, including party leader Oleh Tyahnybok of Svoboda, for "organizing an armed gang" which allegedly fought the Russian 76th Guards Air Assault Division during the first Chechen war. The organisation's Ukrainian National Assembly political wing merged with Right Sector on 22 May 2014.

Leaders
 1990–1994 Yuriy Shukhevych
 1994–1999 Oleh Vitovych
 2002–? Andriy Shkil
 2005–? Yuriy Shukhevych
 2015–2016 Kostiantyn Fushtei
 2016–? Valeriy Bobrovych

International conflicts
 January Events in Lithuania (1991)
 1991 Soviet coup d'état attempt in Moscow (summer 1991)
 Transnistria War in Moldova (spring–summer 1992)
 War in Abkhazia (1992–93)
 First Karabakh war (1988–94)
 First Chechen War in Russia (1995–96)
 Kosovo War in Yugoslavia (1998–99)
 Russo-Ukrainian War (2014–present)

Transnistria

During the Transnistria War, UNA-UNSO members fought with Transnistrian separatists against Moldovan government forces in defence of a large ethnic-Ukrainian minority in Transnistria. Over 50 UNSO members were awarded the Defender of Transnistria Order.

Georgian civil war
In 1993, UNA-UNSO sent volunteers to the Abkhaz–Georgian conflict against Abkhaz separatists. The UNA-UNSO Argo unit joined the Georgian side against Russian-backed Abkhaz forces, and some volunteers joined the Sukhumi Battalion of the Marine Infantry Forces of Georgia. A CPT Ustym squad prevented an amphibious assault of Russian forces near Sukhumi, sinking a Russian military motorboat. Seven UNSO members died near Sukhumi, and 30 members received the Order of Vakhtang Gorgasali medal.

 Sukhumi raid (June 1993)
 Starushkino village ambush (15 July 1993)
 Shromi village assault (17 July 1993)
 Khomi defence (4 October 1993)
 Samtredia defence (17 October 1993)

Russo-Ukrainian War 

UNSO had also fought in the Russo-Ukrainian War as part of the Ukrainian Volunteer Corps and the Territorial defence battalions 131st Separate Reconnaissance Battalion "UNSO", 1st Recon Company UNSO and 55th UNSO Battalion. It also fought in the 2022 Russian invasion of Ukraine.

Ideology and image
The Ukrainian National Assembly – Ukrainian People's Self-Defence 1994 party platform envisioned Kyiv as the centre of a new, pan-Slavic, eastern military bloc. International-security expert Andrew McGregor said in 2006 that the UNA-UNSO "might be best characterized as an influential fringe movement" and "its high visibility belies its limited numbers." Its anthem is "Stay, my love, don't cry, honey", a reprise of "Bella ciao".

Elections

UNA-UNSO parliamentarians
 Yuriy Tyma
 Andriy Shkil

See also
:Category:Ukrainian National Assembly – Ukrainian People's Self-Defence politicians
St Volodymyr's Cathedral ownership controversy
Tetiana Chornovol

References

External links
UNA-UNSO Official party web page
UNA-UNSO Official party blog in VK

Anti-communism in Ukraine
Anti-communist parties
Far-right political parties in Ukraine
Anti-Russian sentiment
Anti-Romanian sentiment
Antisemitism in Ukraine
Euromaidan
Guerrilla organizations
Resistance movements
Defunct political parties in Ukraine
Pro-independence parties in the Soviet Union
Political parties established in 1990
Political parties disestablished in 2014
1990 establishments in Ukraine
2014 disestablishments in Ukraine
Paramilitary organizations based in Ukraine
Institutions with the title of National in Ukraine